Gresham is a village in York County, Nebraska, United States. The population was 223 at the 2010 census.

History
Gresham was originally called Poston, and under the latter name was platted in 1887 when the Fremont, Elkhorn and Missouri Valley Railroad was extended to that point. When it was discovered there was another place in the state with the name Poston, the town was renamed in honor of Walter Q. Gresham, Secretary of State of the United States.

Geography
Gresham is located at  (41.027717, -97.401464).

Demographics

2010 census
As of the census of 2010, there were 223 people, 94 households, and 59 families residing in the village. The racial makeup of the village was 97.8% White, 0.4% African American, 0.4% Native American, and 1.3% from two or more races.

There were 94 households, of which 30.9% had children under the age of 18 living with them, 45.7% were married couples living together, 8.5% had a female householder with no husband present, 8.5% had a male householder with no wife present, and 37.2% were non-families. 34.0% of all households were made up of individuals, and 13.8% had someone living alone who was 65 years of age or older. The average household size was 2.37 and the average family size was 3.03.

The median age in the village was 41.5 years. 28.3% of residents were under the age of 18; 6.2% were between the ages of 18 and 24; 21% were from 25 to 44; 29.6% were from 45 to 64; and 14.8% were 65 years of age or older. The gender makeup of the village was 52.0% male and 48.0% female.

2000 census
As of the census of 2000, there were 270 people, 113 households, and 71 families residing in the village. The population density was 1,011.9 people per square mile (386.1/km2). There were 135 housing units at an average density of 505.9 per square mile (193.1/km2). The racial makeup of the village was 99.63% White and 0.37% Native American.

There were 113 households, out of which 31.9% had children under the age of 18 living with them, 57.5% were married couples living together, 4.4% had a female householder with no husband present, and 36.3% were non-families. 32.7% of all households were made up of individuals, and 18.6% had someone living alone who was 65 years of age or older. The average household size was 2.39 and the average family size was 3.08.

In the village, the population was spread out, with 28.1% under the age of 18, 4.8% from 18 to 24, 31.9% from 25 to 44, 14.8% from 45 to 64, and 20.4% who were 65 years of age or older. The median age was 39 years. For every 100 females, there were 95.7 males. For every 100 females age 18 and over, there were 88.3 males.

As of 2000 the median income for a household in the village was $29,643, and the median income for a family was $36,563. Males had a median income of $28,333 versus $17,321 for females. The per capita income for the village was $18,141. About 8.5% of families and 13.3% of the population were below the poverty line, including 17.0% of those under the age of eighteen and 22.9% of those 65 or over.

References

Villages in Nebraska
Villages in York County, Nebraska